Dreamtime is the ninth studio album by the Stranglers, released in 1986 by Epic Records. The title track was inspired by a belief of the aboriginal peoples of Australia called Dreamtime.

The single "Always the Sun" peaked at No. 30 in the UK Singles Chart. Dreamtime itself reached No. 16 in the UK Albums Chart, the lowest charting studio album during Hugh Cornwell's recording tenure with the band (1977–90).

Singles released in the UK for this album included "Nice in Nice" (peaked at No. 30), "Always the Sun", "Big in America" (peaked at No. 48) and  "Shakin' Like a Leaf" (peaked at No. 58). A fifth single was proposed by the record company, and a remix of the song "Was It You?" was prepared, but it was never released.

Background
The initial recording sessions for Dreamtime began in late 1985 with producer Laurie Latham, who had worked on the band's previous album Aural Sculpture. A few months were spent working on a handful of tracks before the Stranglers and Latham parted company. Latham felt the songs needed more work from the band and had suggested a break in recording. In his 2001 book The Stranglers: Song by Song, guitarist Hugh Cornwell says, "Laurie's comment that our songs weren't ready had left a nasty taste in our mouths because we liked to work with people who were confident in us." The Stranglers therefore decided to continue work on the album with producer Mike Kemp.

Jean-Jacques Burnel (1986): "Well, after three months in a Brussels studio we had only really finished three songs, and these songs aren't even going to be on the album." These three songs were "Shakin' Like a Leaf (single version)", "Norman Normal" (released as a single b-side in 1986), and "You" (released as a single b-side in 1991).

In The Stranglers: Song by Song, Cornwell states that only three songs on Dreamtime were written by the usual songwriting team of himself and Burnel: "Ghost Train", "Mayan Skies" and "Too Precious". The rest were written by the two writers individually. "Always the Sun", "Dreamtime", "Big in America" and "Shakin' Like a Leaf" by Cornwell, and "Was It You?", "You'll Always Reap What You Sow" and "Nice in Nice" by Burnel. Cornwell handles the lead vocals on "You'll Always Reap What You Sow", as the band felt Burnel's "operatic" delivery didn't suit the song.

Dreamtime is the second Stranglers album to feature a three-piece brass section on some tracks. Although credited in the album liner notes for playing drums, Jet Black actually programmed all his drum parts, as he had done on Aural Sculpture.

Critical reception

Contemporary reviews were mixed. A positive review from CMJ New Music Report said that the Stranglers are "a prime example of a band that has streamlined their sound and still retained much of their bite as well as their signature." They described the album as "a smooth production that is pretty, with the ability to be pretty nasty at the same time."

Retrospective reviews were more negative. Alex Ogg of AllMusic wrote, "After Aural Sculpture, this came as a major disappointment. It's not awful, but neither is it in any way essential. ... There are a couple of good songs, like "Always the Sun" and "Nice in Nice" ... but that's simply not enough for a once great band." Ira Robbins of Trouser Press called it an "unfocused time-filler", writing, "Accomplished but bereft of ideas or concept, Dreamtime is a soporific, characterless nightmare."

Track listing

Notes
"Norman Normal" is an Aural Sculpture outtake. The rest of the bonus tracks were recorded for Dreamtime. 
The instrumental track "Burnham Beeches" was originally intended as the B-side to the abandoned "Was it You?" single.

Personnel
Credits adapted from the album liner notes, except where noted.

The Stranglers
 Hugh Cornwell - vocals, guitar
 Jean-Jacques Burnel - bass, vocals (lead vocals on "Was It You?", "Nice in Nice", "Since You Went Away" and "Norman Normal")
 Dave Greenfield - keyboards, backing vocals
 Jet Black - drums, percussion

Additional musicians
 Alex Gifford - saxophone
 Hilary Kops - trumpet
 Martin Veysey - trumpet
 B.J. Cole - pedal steel guitar (on "You'll Always Reap What You Sow")
 Simon Morton - additional percussion

Technical
 The Stranglers - producer
 Mike Kemp - producer (except "Mayan Skies"), engineer, mixing
 Ted Hayton - engineer, mixing, mastering
 Owen Morris - engineer
 Jean Luke Epstein - sleeve design

Bonus tracks
 Sil Wilcox - additional guitar (on "Burnham Beeches")  
 The Stranglers - producer (except on "Norman Normal")
 Mike Kemp - producer (on "Since You Went Away")
 Laurie Latham - producer (on "Norman Normal")
 Timm Baldwin - mixing (on "Burnham Beeches") 
 Tony Bridge - remastering (2001 reissue)

Charts

References

The Stranglers albums
1986 albums
Epic Records albums